Leptolalax marmoratus is a species of frogs in the family Megophryidae.

References 

marmoratus
Amphibians described in 2014